"Save Me" is a song by Scottish rock band Big Country, which was released in 1990 as a single from their compilation album Through a Big Country: Greatest Hits. The song was written by Stuart Adamson and produced by Tim Palmer. It reached No. 41 on the UK Singles Chart and remained in the Top 100 for three weeks.

Background
During March 1990, Big Country spent time recording two new songs, "Save Me" and "Heart of the World" at Livingston Studios in London. The tracks that would emerge as B-Sides on the singles were recorded at Chipping Norton Studios in Oxford during the same month. As drummer Mark Brzezicki had left the band in 1989, the sessions featured Pat Ahern on drums. "Save Me" was selected as the first song to be released as a single, preceding "Heart of the World", which followed in July. Although the band had wanted "Heart of the World" to be released first, the band's label, Mercury, opted for "Save Me" instead.

"Save Me" was released in April 1990 in the UK, a month before the band's compilation Through a Big Country: Greatest Hits, which the song would also appear on. It was released in May in Europe. Met with a lack of airplay on BBC Radio 1, the song stalled at No. 41 on the UK Singles Chart. Speaking to the We Save No Souls! fanzine in 1991, Adamson said of the song's limited chart success: "I know for a fact that if it had been played on Radio 1 it would have been a hit. I'm positive, 'cause everybody I know and people who don't even like the band who heard the single, liked it. "Save Me" was very much sort of "old-style" Big Country."

Adamson said of the song to Phil Alexander of Mojo in 1990: ""Save Me" actually just came from a load of jamming. It's a lot more bluesy than anything I've come up with before and I wanted to make it a quasi-spiritual song. Working with Tim Palmer on that was really enjoyable after general dissatisfaction that we felt working with Peter Wolf on the last album. We'd like Tim to work with us on the next album if he's got time."

Promotion
The song's music video was directed by Howard Greenhalgh and shot in London on 24 April. On 17 May, Adamson and Bruce Watson would perform an acoustic version of the song on the James Whale Show. The band also performed the song on the variety show Cannon and Ball's Casino, which was broadcast on 19 May.

Release
"Save Me" was released by Phonogram/Mercury in the UK and across Europe on 7", 12", cassette and CD formats. The main B-side on all formats was "Pass Me By", which was written by Adamson. On the 12" vinyl, a second B-side, "Dead on Arrival", was added, which was written by Watson. The CD version of the single featured a different second B-side; "World on Fire", which was written by Butler. All three B-sides were exclusive to the "Save Me" single and were produced by the band. In the UK, a limited edition 12" vinyl was released in addition to the main 12" release. It featured two live tracks; "Wonderland" and "Thousand Yard Stare", which were both recorded at the Palace of Sports in Moscow, USSR on 1 October 1988.

Critical reception
On its release, Music & Media wrote, "Gone are the E-bow guitars, the traditional Celtic melodies, and the 'grandeur' of the old Big Country sound. What is left is a straightforward rock song, which seems to be aimed at the US market." Peter Kinghorn of Newcastle Evening Chronicle commented, "The big rocking sound is different, but still recognisably them." Iestyn George of Record Mirror wrote, "The word 'rousing' was invented so that there would be a suitable description for Big Country's music. Clichéd, overblown and unimaginative also spring to mind, and 'Save Me' kicks off with a dreadful guitar solo from which Adamson leads us on an unremarkable voyage to tedium and back." Jon Wilde of Melody Maker stated, "'Save Me' is yet another clod-hopping anthem, scraped off the sides of what must now be a very worn toilet-bowl. I've seen pensioners hawk up phlegm with more panache."

In a review of Through a Big Country, New Musical Express considered it a "shame" that the compilation opened with "Save Me", which they described as a "turgid meander across Gary Moore's builder's yard terrain which taints the subsequent clutch of faves from The Crossing". In a 1990 issue of Melody Maker, a review of the band's live show at Glasgow stated: "The ropey new single, "Save Me", even comes with a touch of the vitriol more commonly reserved for the asset stripping Southern vultures who haunt Big Country's lowland industrial anthems." Mark Liddell of Riff Raff described the song as "catchy enough" in a review of the band's 1990 concert at the Hammersmith Odeon.

Track listing
7" single
"Save Me" - 4:28
"Pass Me By" - 3:58

12" single
"Save Me" - 5:27
"Pass Me By" - 3:56
"Dead on Arrival" - 3:26

12" single (UK Limited Edition)
"Save Me" - 5:29
"Wonderland (Live)" - 5:59
"Thousand Yard Stare (Live)" - 4:49

Cassette single
"Save Me" - 4:28
"Pass Me By" - 3:58

CD single
"Save Me" - 5:34
"Pass Me By" - 4:03
"World on Fire" - 3:49

Personnel
Big Country
Stuart Adamson - vocals, guitar
Bruce Watson - guitar
Tony Butler - bass
Pat Ahern - drums

Production
Tim Palmer - producer of "Save Me"
Big Country - producers of "Pass Me By", "Dead on Arrival" and "World on Fire"
Pounda - mastering
Ian Grant - management

Charts

References

1990 singles
1990 songs
Big Country songs
Songs written by Stuart Adamson
Mercury Records singles
Music videos directed by Howard Greenhalgh